Thomas Preston (died 1604) was an English politician.

He was the only son of John Preston of Preston Patrick, Westmorland.

He was a Justice of the Peace for Lancashire and Westmorland and appointed High Sheriff of Lancashire for 1584–85.

He was a Member (MP) of the Parliament of England for Knaresborough in 1589.

He married Anne or Margaret, the daughter of John Westby of Mowbrick, Lancashire; they had one son, John.

References

16th-century births
1604 deaths
English MPs 1589
High Sheriffs of Lancashire